Remzi is both a Turkish surname and given name. Notable people with the name include:

Given name:
 Remzi Başakbuğday (born 1989), Turkish taekwondo practitioner
 Remzi Sedat İncesu (born 1972), Turkish basketball coach
 Remzi Aydın Jöntürk (1936–1987), Turkish film director
 Remzi Giray Kaçar (born 1985), Turkish footballer
 Remzi Arpaci-Dusseau (born 1971), Turkish-American computer scientist

Surname:
 Sav Remzi, British record producer
 Shener Remzi (born 1976), Bulgarian footballer of Turkish descent

See also
 Ramzi

Turkish-language surnames
Turkish masculine given names